This article contains information about the literary events and publications of 1692.

Events
November 
Nahum Tate becomes Poet Laureate of England.
Thomas Rymer is made Historiographer Royal, and mounts a major effort to preserve and publish historical documents.
December 9 – Playwright William Mountfort is attacked in a London street and stabbed; he dies the next day.

New books

Prose
Richard Ames – The Jacobite Coventicle, Sylvia's Complaint, of Her Sexes Unhappiness (in answer to Robert Gould)
Madame d'Aulnoy – Histoire de Jean de Bourbon, Prince de Carency (The Prince of Carency)
Richard Baxter – Paraphrase on the Psalms of David
Richard Bentley – three "confutations" of Atheism and The Folly of Atheism, and (what is now called) Deism
Gilbert Burnet – A Discourse on the Pastoral Care
William Congreve – Incognita; or, Love and Duty Reconcil'd: A novel
Anne Conway, Viscountess Conway – The Principles of the Most Ancient and Modern Philosophy
John Dryden – Eleonara
Roger L'Estrange – Fables, of Aesop and other Eminent Mythologists
Ihara Saikaku – Reckonings That Carry Men Through the World
Ben Jonson – the third folio collection of the Works
John Locke – Some Considerations of the Consequences of the Lowering of Interest and Raising the Value of Money
George Savile, 1st Marquess of Halifax – Maxims of State
Sir William Temple – Memoirs of What Past in Christendom: From the war begun in 1672 to the peace concluded 1679
William Walsh – Letters and Poems, Amorous and Gallant
Anthony à Wood – Athenae Oxonienses, vol. ii.
Nicolás Antonio – Bibliotheca Hispana Vetus

Drama
Reuben Bourne – The Contented Cuckold, or Woman's Advocate
Nicholas Brady – The Rape, or the Innocent Impostors
John Crowne – Regulus
John Dryden (with Thomas Southerne) – Cleomenes, the Spartan Hero
Thomas D'Urfey – The Marriage-Hater Matched
William Mountfort – Henry II
Elkanah Settle – The Fairy-Queen, an adaptation of A Midsummer Night's Dream, with music by Henry Purcell
Thomas Shadwell – The Volunteers
Thomas Southerne – The Maid's Last Prayer, or Any Rather Than Fail

Poetry
John Dennis, Poems in Burleseque
Thomas Fletcher – Poems on Several Occasions
Charles Gildon – Miscellany Poems upon Several Occasions
Sor Juana Inés de la Cruz – Obras (second volume)
Antonio de Solís y Rivadeneyra – Varias poesías sagradas y profanas

Births
February 25 Karl Ludwig von Pöllnitz, German adventurer and writer (died 1775) 
February 29 John Byrom, English poet (died 1763)
April 5 Adrienne Lecouvreur, French actress (died 1730)
May 18 Joseph Butler, theologian of the Church of England (died 1752)
November 6 Louis Racine, French poet (died 1763)
Unknown dates
Li E (厲鶚), Chinese poet (died 1752)
John Mottley, English dramatist, biographer and compiler of jokes (died 1750)

Deaths
By February – Sir George Etherege, English dramatist (born c. 1636)
May 6 – Nathaniel Lee, English dramatist (born c. 1653)
May 18/19 – Elias Ashmole, English antiquarian (born 1617)
July 30 (buried) – Jacob Bauthumley, English radical religious writer (born 1613)
September 21 – Ermes di Colorêt, Friulian nobleman and poet (born 1622)
November 6 – Gédéon Tallemant des Réaux, French biographer (born 1619)
November 19 – Thomas Shadwell, English Poet Laureate and playwright (born c. 1642)
December 10 – William Mountfort, English dramatist and actor (born c. 1664)
unknown date - Zera Yacob, Ethiopian philosopher (born 1599)

References

 
Years of the 17th century in literature